Franz Esser (20 January 1900 – 21 September 1982) was a German international footballer.

References

1900 births
1982 deaths
Association football forwards
German footballers
Germany international footballers
Holstein Kiel players